Panay Gulf is an extension of the Sulu Sea, reaching between the islands of Panay and Negros in the Philippines. The gulf contains the island-province of Guimaras and extends into the Iloilo Strait, between Panay and Guimaras, and into Guimaras Strait, between Guimaras and Negros. Guimaras Strait connects Panay Gulf with the Visayan Sea.

The Port of Iloilo is the busiest port on the gulf, which is a major route used by ships plying the areas between Iloilo City, Bacolod, and Zamboanga further to the south.

The Panay Landing during World War II occurred from the Panay Gulf.

References 

Gulfs of the Philippines
Bodies of water of the Sulu Sea
Gulfs of the Pacific Ocean
Landforms of Iloilo
Landforms of Antique (province)
Landforms of Guimaras
Landforms of Negros Occidental